"The Story of the Three Bears" is a tale by Robert Southey published in 1837. It is generally known today as "The Three Bears", "Goldilocks and the Three Bears" or simply "Goldilocks".

The Three Bears can also refer to:

 The Three Bears (comic strip), a long-running British comic strip from The Beano
 The Three Bears (Looney Tunes), animated characters in the Warner Bros. Looney Tunes and Merrie Melodies series of cartoons
 Seneca County Courthouse Complex at Ovid, historic American courthouse complex in the state of New York